Xinghai Park is a beach park on the southern coast of Dalian, Liaoning Province, China.

Description
Xinghai Park was originally established by the South Manchuria Railway Company in 1909, as "Hoshi-ga-Ura" (meaning "Star Beach"). It was an integrated resort with a bathing beach, a golf course, and the Hoshi-ga-ura Yamato Hotel, and was chosen as one of the Eight Scenic Spots of Lüshun-Dalian.

In 1945, the park's name was changed to Xinghai Park. It now covers an area of 150,000 square meters, has a beach of 800 meters long, and is one of the four major beaches in Dalian. The sea has a 55 meters high bungee jumping facility from New Zealand. The Xinghai Bay Bridge can be seen offshore. There is also a coastal walkway to Xinghai Square.

To the east of Xinghai Park, is also an oceanarium, called the Sunasia Ocean World.

The park is open free of charge from 7:30 to 17:30 (longer hours in the summer).

Transportation
Xinghai Beach bus stop on Zhongshan Road, part of Lushun South Road, which connects Lüshun with Dalian downtown. On Dalian Metro's Line 1, get off at Second Hospital of Dalian Medical University Station, and walk west for 500 meters.

See also 
Xinghai Square
Xinghai Bay Bridge

References

External links 

Xinghai Park, Dalian (Youtube)

Parks in Liaoning
Dalian